, commonly shortened to simply Furifuri, is a Japanese adult visual novel developed by 130cm released on August 29, 2008, for the PC as a DVD. The gameplay in Furifuri follows a linear plot line, which offers pre-determined scenarios and courses of interaction, and focuses on the appeal of the five female main characters.

Gameplay

The gameplay in Furifuri requires little player interaction from the player, as most of the duration of the game is only spent on reading the text that appears on the screen, representing either dialogue between characters, or the inner thoughts of the protagonist. Every so often, the player will come to a "decision point", where he or she is given the chance to choose from multiple options. The time between these points is variable and can occur anywhere from a minute to much longer. Gameplay pauses at these points and depending on which choice the player makes, the plot will progress in a specific direction. There are five main plot lines that the player will have the chance to experience, one for each of the heroines in the story. To view all five plot lines, the player will have to replay the game multiple times and make different decisions to progress the plot in an alternate direction.

Plot

Setting and themes
Hoshifuri-dai is split into several regions. Close to the park is a school called , which the main characters attend.

Skies and astronomy are recurring themes in Furifuri. The mysterious object, waste falls from the sky. The names of various locations in the game are attributed to astronomy, the town's shopping district shares its name with stardust, and the park is named after the planet Venus. The school is named after a sextant, and the beach's name refers to the sky's beach.

Principal characters
Haruaki is a fan of the mysterious object waste, and is the president of the waste club at school. He is skilled at housekeeping tasks, and believes that everyone can get along well if they have delicious food together. Although loyal, Minori is rarely ever useful to Horobi due to her energetic and gluttony personality. , another heroine, is the apprentice to the hero . Though proud of this fact and works hard in becoming a hero, she wishes of a romantic interest of someone her age. She maintains a calm personality, and never hesitates before helping anyone. , both heroines, are twins born to the royal family of a pirate country. Despite their selfish personalities, they care about others, though in a subtle way. , the fifth and last heroine, is a first year student from Haruaki's school. She is a model student, and is the only other waste club member other than Haruaki, joining due to her crush with Haruaki.

Story
The story of Furifuri revolves around the male protagonist Haruaki Aki, a young high school student who lives in the town of Hoshifuri. One day, on his way home from school, Haruaki observed the falling of a waste. Having always been a fan of the waste, and because of the rare chances to obtain waste even to locals, Haruaki heads straight to where the waste has landed. Upon his arrival, Haruaki discovers a small piece of light. As he reaches out for it, the light disappears, leaving only the piece of waste. As Haruaki slips it into his pocket and decides to go home, two lights suddenly blows from the sky, and along with the lights, two girls, Minori Momose and Zyun Ōtori lands on the ground. The two girls then engaged in battle while Haruaki watches by the side thinking they are shooting a film. Haruaki is then seriously injured, but is able to recover with the power of the waste he found earlier, absorbing Minori's master, Horobi in the process. With Horobi now residing in Haruaki's body, Minori decides to stay at Haruaki's house, with Zyun staying in town to monitor them.

Development

Furifuri is the fifth title to be developed by 130 cm, after previous titles such as Princess Bride. Art direction is headed by Iko Izumi, who has also provided the character designs used in the game, and will be the artist's first work on a visual novel project. Planning for Furifuri is headed by Makoto Hyōtō, with the scenario being provided by Kansei Nishisora. Music used in the game is composed by U-ma. Both Makoto Hyōtō and U-ma has previously been in the development team of Kanojo-tachi no Ryūgi, 130 cm's previous game.

Release history
On July 25, 2008, a free game demo of Furifuri was released to the public online, which gave the player a glimpse into the characters and the story of the game through the typical gameplay of a visual novel in which the player reads the text that appears on the screen. The full game was released on August 29, 2008, as a DVD playable only on a Microsoft Windows PC.

Music
The visual novel has one theme song. The opening theme, entitled "Stars Biscuit" was performed and written by Kotoko, and composed and arranged by Maiko Iuchi. An original soundtrack disc containing the opening theme song was released on December 28, 2008, alongside a paperbag as part of 130 cm's Comiket 75 product set.

Reception and sales
Furifuri was placed as the seventh most purchased game on solely Getchu.com throughout the month of August 2008, and was also the fifth most purchased game in Japan that month, according to a national ranking of PC games in Japan.

References

External links
Official Furifuri visual novel website 

2008 video games
Bishōjo games
Eroge
Japan-exclusive video games
Romance video games
Video games developed in Japan
Visual novels
Windows games
Windows-only games